Events in the year 1824 in Portugal.

Incumbents
Monarch: John VI

Events
30 April – April Revolt

Births
 thumb |right |100 px |António Maria Barreiros Arrobas 

18 July – António Maria Barreiros Arrobas, colonial administrator (d. 1888).

Deaths

January – Catarina de Lencastre, Viscountess of Balsemão, noblewoman, poet and playwright (b. 1749).

References

 
1820s in Portugal
Years of the 19th century in Portugal